Felipe Meligeni Rodrigues Alves (born 19 February 1998) is a Brazilian professional tennis player.
He has a career high ATP singles ranking of No. 137 achieved on 25 July 2022 and a career high ATP doubles ranking of No. 75 achieved on 20 June 2022. He is currently the No. 2 Brazilian tennis player.

Junior career
Meligeni Alves won the 2016 US Open boys' doubles title, partnering Juan Carlos Aguilar.

Professional career

2020: ATP debut and maiden Challenger singles and doubles titles
Meligeni made his debut in an ATP Tour singles main draw as wildcard at the 2020 Rio Open, losing in three sets to world No. 4 Dominic Thiem in the first round.

Meligeni won his first ATP Challenger doubles title at Guayaquil alongside Venezuelan Luis David Martínez, defeating spaniards Sergio Martos Gornés and Jaume Munar in the final.

Meligeni Alves won his first ATP Challenger singles title at São Paulo, defeating Portuguese Frederico Ferreira Silva, on 29 November 2020. He also won his second doubles title alongside Luis David Martínez in the same event.

2021: First ATP title and top 100 debut in doubles 
In March 2021, Meligeni Alves won his first ATP 250 doubles title alongside Rafael Matos at the 2021 Córdoba Open defeating Romain Arneodo and Benoît Paire. He reached the top 100 on 14 June 2021 at world No. 99 in doubles.

2022: Top 150 debut in singles, Second ATP doubles title 
In February 2022, Meligeni Alves won his second ATP 250 doubles title at the 2022 Chile Open alongside Matos.

He reached the top 150 at No. 144 on 18 July 2022 following his second Challenger title at the 2022 Iași Open in Romania and a career-high singles ranking of No. 137 on 25 July 2022.

He finished the year ranked at world No. 149 in singles on 21 November 2022.

Personal life
Meligeni Alves' older sister Carolina Meligeni Alves is also a tennis player and their uncle, Fernando Meligeni, was also a tennis player who reached the semifinals at the 1999 French Open and at the 1996 Olympic Summer Games.

ATP career finals

Doubles: 2 (2 titles)

Challenger and Futures/World Tennis Tour Finals

Singles: 11 (6–5)

Doubles: 19 (8–11)

National representation

Davis Cup

Meligeni Alves was first nominated to play for Brazil in Davis Cup in September 2021 against Lebanon. Meligeni Alves made his debut in Davis Cup against Hady Habib and won in straight sets in the second rubber which after allowed the Brazilian team to confirm the 4-0 tie and advance into the 2022 Davis Cup Qualifying Round. 
Currently, Meligeni Alves sports a 3–2 record in Davis Cup matches.

United Cup
He represented Brazil at the 2023 United Cup as the No. 2 player.

Junior Grand Slam finals

Doubles: 1 (1 title)

References

External links
 
 

1998 births
Living people
Brazilian male tennis players
Sportspeople from Campinas
US Open (tennis) junior champions
Grand Slam (tennis) champions in boys' doubles